Jason McCollough "Saundy" Saunderson (February 22, 1886 – February 17, 1950) was an American football, basketball and baseball coach. He was the head football coach at South Dakota State College of Agriculture and Mechanic Arts — now known as South Dakota State University — from 1908 to 1910 and at Morningside College from 1912 to 1941, compiling a career college football coaching record of 124–105–14. He was also the head basketball coach at South Dakota State from 1907 to 1910, tallying a mark of 11–7, and the college's head baseball coach from 1909 to 1911, amassing a record of 16–6.

Coaching career
Saunderson was the head football coach at Morningside College in Sioux City, Iowa. He held that position for 30 seasons, from 1912 until 1941. His coaching record at Morningside was 116–97–11.

Head coaching record

Football

References

1886 births
1950 deaths
Morningside Mustangs athletic directors
Morningside Mustangs football coaches
South Dakota State Jackrabbits athletic directors
South Dakota State Jackrabbits baseball coaches
South Dakota State Jackrabbits football coaches
South Dakota State Jackrabbits men's basketball coaches
People from Manitoulin Island
Canadian emigrants to the United States